Trevor Brown (born 1959) is an English artist from London but based in Japan. His "occasionally shocking" work explores issues of paraphilia.

Life and work
Brown has been living and working in Japan since 1994.

His work explores paraphilias, such as lolicon, ero guro, BDSM, and other fetish themes. Innocence, violence, misogyny, and Japanese popular culture all collide in Brown's art.

Early features on Trevor Brown's art appeared in Adam Parfrey's Apocalypse Culture II, Shade Rupe's Funeral Party 2, and in Jim Goad's ANSWER Me! zine. Since then his interviews and art have been featured in numerous publications worldwide, most recently on the cover of Gothic & Lolita Bible in Japan. His work also appears on a variety of book and record covers. He has illustrated for Coup de Grace an edition of Friedrich Nietzsche's Der Antichrist. Brown has also had several books of his art published.

Publications
 Evil (1996)
 Forbidden Fruit (1997)
 My Alphabet pp (1999)
 Temple of Blasphemy (1999)
 Medical Fun (2001)
 Li'l Miss Sticky Kiss (2004)
 Rubber Doll (2007)
 Babies Book (2007)
 Trevor Brown's Alice (2010)
 Girls War (2013)
 Pandora (2015)
 Trecos (2017)
 La Nursery Noire (2019)

Exhibitions
 1995 "Evil", NG Gallery, Tokyo, Japan
 1996 "Doll Hospital", Keibunsha Art Box, Kyoto, Japan
 1996 "Evil Twin", NG Gallery, Tokyo, Japan
 1997 "Japabon", Taco-che, Tokyo, Japan
 1997 "Forbidden Fruit", Azzlo Gallery, Tokyo, Japan
 1998 "Trevor Brown and Toshio Saeki", Merry Karnowski Gallery, Los Angeles
 1999 "My Alphabet", Merry Karnowski Gallery, Los Angeles
 2001 "Sexy Nurse", Taco-che, Tokyo, Japan
 2001 "Rope, Rapture and Bloodshed" (with Antoine Bernhart), Mondo Bizzarro Gallery, Bologna, Italy
 2001 "Medical Fun", Span Art Gallery, Tokyo, Japan
 2002 "New World" (with Keiti Ota), Merry Karnowski Gallery, Los Angeles
 2003 "Retrospective", Mondo Bizzarro Gallery, Bologna, Italy
 2004 "Valentine Fair", Taco-che, Tokyo, Japan
 2004 "Li'l Miss Sticky Kiss",  Gallery Le Deco, Tokyo, Japan
 2005 "Sakura", Taco-che, Tokyo, Japan
 2007 "Rubber Doll", Gallery Le Deco, Tokyo, Japan
 2007 "Rubber Doll", Subterraneans, Osaka, Japan
 2007 "Babies Exhibition", Taco-che, Tokyo, Japan
 2010 "Time of Alice" (with Yuriko Yamayoshi), Bunkamura Gallery, Tokyo, Japan
 2012 "Toy box span art gallery, Ginza, Tokyo (with hippie coco)
 2013 "女の子戦争 (girls war) Bunkamura gallery, Shibuya, Tokyo
 2014 "ドローイング・ブック (drawing book) parabolica-bis, Asakusa, Tokyo
 2015 "トレヴァー・ブラウン / 三浦悦子 / 記念展示 (mini-exhibition) Sanseido bookstore, Ikebukuro, Tokyo (with etsuko miura)
 2015 "二つの聖餐 －闇から光へ－ (holy communion - from darkness to light) Bunkamura gallery, Shibuya, Tokyo (with etsuko miura)
 2015 "Trajectory of Trevor Brown (mini-exhibition) span art gallery, Ginza, Tokyo (with etsuko miura)
 2016 "Trevor Brown × 七菜乃 Span art gallery, Ginza, Tokyo (collaboration with nananano)
 2017 "Editions Trevile 20th anniversary Merry art gallery, Yokohama (group show)
 2018 "トレコス出版記念展 (Trecos publication commemoration) span art gallery, Ginza, Tokyo (with nananano & mari shimizu)
 2019 "La Nursery Noire Gallery le deco, Shibuya, Tokyo

Album and single covers

 Crystal Castles - Alice Practice
 Deicide - Once upon the Cross 
 Urbangarde - Syojo Ha Nido Shinu (Girls Only Live Twice)
 Venetian Snares - Horse and Goat
 Venetian Snares - Find Candace
 Venetian Snares - Winter in the Belly of a Snake
 Venetian Snares - Doll Doll Doll
 Venetian Snares - "Filth"
 Eyelicker Compilation
 Noise/Girl - Darkroom
 Noise/Girl - Discopathology
 Despair - Beautiful Japanese Sight
 John Zorn - The Gift
 Hoppy Kamiyama - ESP
 Dead Pop Stars - DPS
 Extreme Music From Africa Compilation
 Whitehouse - Just Like a Cunt
 Whitehouse - Quality Time
 Whitehouse - Another Crack of the White Whip
 Whitehouse - Twice Is Not Enough
 Whitehouse - Halogen
 The Sadist - Last Live 1990
 Come Again II Compilation
 Coil - Hellraiser Themes
 Jarboe - Beast
 GG Allin - Watch Me Kill 
 Bushpig Scat Butcher - The Art of Gore 
 Babuchan - SHIGO-NIKKI

References

External links
Baby Art - Official Trevor Brown Site

English artists
Fetish artists
Living people
British erotic artists
English expatriates in Japan
1959 births